The Men's individual normal hill competition at the FIS Nordic World Ski Championships 2019 was held on 28 February and 1 March 2019. A qualification was held on 28 February.

Results

Qualification
The qualification was held on 28 February at 17:00.

Final
The first round was held on 1 March at 16:00 and the final round at 17:12.

References

Men's individual normal hill